Lyginia is a genus of three rhizomatous plant species all endemic to South Western Australia. They tend to grow in dry, sandy areas.

Lyginia barbata

Lyginia barbata is a perennial herb found near Perth, Albany, and Esperance.

Lyginia excelsa
Lyginia excelsa is a Priority One herb found in a few small populations across Western Australia.

Lyginia imberbis
Lyginia imberbis is another perennial herb found all across Southwest Australia.

References

Restionaceae
Poales genera
Endemic flora of Western Australia